was a Japanese courtier (kuge) and politician of the late Asuka and early Nara period. He founded the Nanke ("Southern") branch of the Fujiwara clan. His court rank is Senior First Rank.

Life 
Muchimaro is the eldest son of Fujiwara no Fuhito, and her mother Soga no Shōshi is the daughter of Soga no Murajiko. 

He married a granddaughter of Abe no Miushi, with whom he had two sons Fujiwara no Toyonari and Fujiwara no Nakamaro. Among his daughters was consort of Emperor Shōmu.

Muchimaro became the head of Ministry of Civil Services in 718. When Fuhito, Muchimaro's father, died in 720, Prince Nagaya was at the highest rank in the state government. Prince Nagaya was grandson of Emperor Tenmu, but not a son of Fujiwara family, therefore was seen as a threat by Muchimaro and his three brothers. After successfully removing Prince Nagaya in 729, Muchimaro rose to Dainagon (Counselor of the first rank).

In 734, he was promoted to Udaijin or "Minister of the Right". In 737, he was made Sadaijin or "Minister of the Left", but died of smallpox the following day.

The History of the Fujiwara House (Tōshi Kaden 藤氏家伝) included his biography and states the following: "Muchimaro, the Fujiwara Great Minister of the Left, was a man from the Sakyō district. He was the oldest son of the Head of the Council of State Fuhito, and his mother was a daughter of the Soga Great Minister of the Treasury. He was born in the mansion at Ōhara on the fifteenth day of the fourth month of 680, the ninth year since the enthronement of the sovereign Tenmu. Because he cultivated righteousness, he received this name."

Family
Father: Fujiwara no Fuhito
Mother: Soga no Shōshi (蘇我娼子, ?–?), daughter of Soga no Murajiko (蘇我連子).
Main Wife: Sada-hime (阿倍貞媛, 阿倍貞吉 or 阿倍真虎), grand-daughter of Abe no Miushi (阿倍御主人).
1st son: Fujiwara no Toyonari (藤原豊成, 704–765)
2nd son: Fujiwara no Nakamaro (藤原 仲麻呂, 706–764)
Wife: name unknown, daughter of Ki no Maro (紀麻呂).
3rd son: Fujiwara no Otomaro (藤原乙麻呂, ?–760?)
Wife: (阿祢姫), daughter of (小治田功麻呂).
4th son: Fujiwara no Kosemaro (藤原巨勢麻呂, ?–764)
Wife: name unknown
Daughter: Minamidono (南殿, ?–748), consort of Emperor Shōmu.

See also

 Fujiwara Nanke

 Fujiwara no Nakamaro
 735–737 Japanese smallpox epidemic

Notes

References 
 Bauer, Mikael. The History of the Fujiwara House. Kent, UK: Renaissance Books, 2020. . 
Hall, John Whitney. The Cambridge History of Japan. Cambridge: Cambridge University Press, 1988. (pp. 247–249)
 Nussbaum, Louis-Frédéric and Käthe Roth. (2005).  Japan encyclopedia. Cambridge: Harvard University Press. ;  OCLC 58053128

External links 
 Sonpi Bunmyaku, viewable through the Digital Archive of National Diet Library (Japan).

Fujiwara clan
680 births
737 deaths
People of Asuka-period Japan
People of Nara-period Japan
Deaths from smallpox
Infectious disease deaths in Japan
Japanese nobility